Joi is an Italian Entertainment TV channel, owned by Mediaset and broadcast on Premium Gallery, a digital terrestrial television service in Italy. It is devoted to family entertainment and broadcasts movies and TV series. At the moment, Joi is not available on satellite television, and is only available in Italy.

Programs

See also 
Mediaset Premium

External links
http://www.mediasetpremium.mediaset.it/canale/index_joi.shtml 

Mediaset television channels
Television channels in Italy
Television channels and stations established in 2008
Italian-language television stations